Marquess of Iria Flavia is a hereditary title in the Spanish nobility. This marquessate was bestowed by Juan Carlos I of Spain by Royal Decree 1137/1996, on 17 May 1996 on the author and Nobel laureate, Camilo José Cela Trulock, in recognition of his contribution to literature and the Spanish language. The title recalls the Celtiberian port of Iria Flavia in Galicia, northwestern Spain, where Cela was born and is now buried.

The current holder of the title is his only child, Camilo José Cela Conde.

Holders
 Camilo José Cela Trulock, 1st Marquess of Iria Flavia (1996–2002).
 Camilo José Cela Conde, 2nd Marquess of Iria Flavia (2003–).

The heiress apparent and the only person in line of succession to the marquessate is the present holder's only child, his daughter, Camila Cela Marty (b. 1989).

References

Marquessates in the Spanish nobility
Noble titles created in 1996
Camilo José Cela